Australia competed at the 1936 Summer Olympics in Berlin, Germany. 32 competitors, 28 men and 4 women, took part in 26 events in 7 sports. Australian athletes have competed in every Summer Olympic Games. In terms of medals won Berlin 1936 was Australia's poorest result at the Summer Olympics, winning just a single bronze in the Men's triple jump.

Medalist 

The following Australian competitor won a medal at the games.

Athletics

Key
Note–Ranks given for track events are within the athlete's heat only
Q = Qualified for the next round
q = Qualified for the next round as a fastest loser or, in field events, by position without achieving the qualifying target
NR = National record
N/A = Round not applicable for the event
Bye = Athlete not required to compete in round
NP = Not placed

Men
Track & road events

Men
Field Events

Women
Field Events

Boxing

Men

Cycling

Men
Road race

Track
Ranks given are within the heat.

Diving

Rowing

Australia had 12 rowers participate in three out of seven rowing events in 1936.

Ranks given are within the heat.

Swimming

Men
Ranks given are within the heat.

Women
Ranks given are within the heat.

Wrestling

Freestyle wrestling
 Men's

References

Nations at the 1936 Summer Olympics
1936
Olympics